Émile Clody (7 August 1903 – 28 June 1960) was a French wrestler. He competed at the 1924 and the 1928 Summer Olympics.

References

External links
 

1903 births
1960 deaths
Olympic wrestlers of France
Wrestlers at the 1924 Summer Olympics
Wrestlers at the 1928 Summer Olympics
French male sport wrestlers
Place of birth missing